The Batu Pahat Well is a historic well at the village of Minyak Beku, Batu Pahat District, Johor, Malaysia. It was allegedly built during the 15th-century by fleeing Siamese soldiers from the Malacca Sultanate, who chiselled the rocks around it in search of water. It was said that the name of the town of Batu Pahat was originated from the well's name. It is currently one of the most popular tourist destinations of the area.

References

Buildings and structures in Johor
Archaeological sites in Malaysia
Historic sites in Malaysia
Batu Pahat District
Water wells in Malaysia